This article list all the confirmed broadcasters for the UEFA Super Cup with each broadcaster holding three season broadcasting rights.

Broadcasters

2021–2023 seasons

References 

broadcasters
UEFA Super Cup